Michael Hugh Hicks Beach, Viscount Quenington (19 January 1877 – 23 April 1916) was a British politician.

Biography
Hicks-Beach was the eldest son of former Chancellor of the Exchequer, Michael Hicks-Beach, 1st Earl St Aldwyn, and his wife Lady Lucy Catherine Fortescue. He sat as Conservative Member of Parliament (MP) for Tewkesbury from 1906 to 1916 and was a board member at Lloyds Bank.

Hicks-Beach fought in the First World War as a Captain with the 1/1st Royal Gloucestershire Hussars and died, aged 39, on 23 April 1916 as a result of wounds received at Katia, Egypt.  He is buried at the Cairo New British Protestant Cemetery alongside his wife. Viscount Quenington is commemorated on Panel 8 of the Parliamentary War Memorial in Westminster Hall, one of 22 MPs that died during World War I to be named on that memorial. Viscount Quenington is one of 19 MPs who fell in the war who are commemorated by heraldic shields in the Commons Chamber. A further act of commemoration came with the unveiling in 1932 of a manuscript-style illuminated book of remembrance for the House of Commons, which includes a short biographical account of the life and death of Viscount Quenington.

From 1915, when his father was created 1st Earl St Aldwyn, Hicks-Beach held the courtesy title of Viscount Quenington.

Marriage and children
Hicks-Beach married Marjorie Brocklehurst, daughter of Henry Dent Brocklehurst of Sudeley Castle, on 28 September 1909.  They had two children:

 Lady Delia Mary Hicks-Beach (born 2 August 1910, died 29 November 2006), married Brigadier Sir Michael Dillwyn-Venables-Llewelyn, MVO, 3rd Bt.
 Michael John Hicks-Beach, 2nd Earl St Aldwyn (born 9 October 1912, died 29 January 1992).

Lady Quenington died in Egypt on 4 March 1916, less than two months before her husband. Their son Michael succeeded his grandfather in the earldom only a week after his father's death.  He also became a prominent politician.

References 

 ThePeerage.com: Michael Hugh Hicks-Beach, Viscount Quenington

External links 
 

1877 births
1916 deaths
Members of the Parliament of the United Kingdom for English constituencies
Conservative Party (UK) MPs for English constituencies
Hicks Beach, Michael
Hicks Beach, Michael
UK MPs 1910–1918
British Army personnel of World War I
British military personnel killed in World War I
Michael, Viscount Quenington
Heirs apparent who never acceded
British courtesy viscounts
Royal Gloucestershire Hussars officers